The 2015 Verizon IndyCar Series was the 20th season of the IndyCar Series and the 104th season of American open wheel racing. Its premier event was the 99th Indianapolis 500, which was held on May 24. Will Power returned as the reigning champion, while Ryan Hunter-Reay was the defending Indy 500 champion. Chevrolet entered the season as the reigning Manufacturers' champion. Indianapolis 500 and the season finale counted for double points.

The season was marred by the death of driver Justin Wilson at Pocono, after being struck on the head by debris from Sage Karam's car.

A week after Wilson's fatal accident, the finale was held at Sonoma Raceway, where Scott Dixon secured his fourth career title after a low-key season that saw him win on a tiebreak against Juan Pablo Montoya following his third win of the season after many consistent finishes leading up to the finale. Montoya won the Indianapolis 500 earlier in the season. It was a very competitive season with no standout performers and many different race winners and pacesetters. Except Dixon's three race wins, he finished on the podium only once, but due to their consistent finishing Dixon and Montoya had a significant margin to reigning champion Will Power in third.

Confirmed entries

Notes
 Bryan Clauson drove an entry fielded by Jonathan Byrd's Racing at the Indy 500 in 2015 and 2016. KV Racing Technology was confirmed to support the entry.
 Ed Carpenter Racing and Sarah Fisher Hartman Racing merged to form CFH Racing, and use Chevrolet engines and aerokits in 2015.
 Andretti Autosport re-signed Ryan Hunter-Reay and sponsor DHL to a multi year contract.
 Josef Newgarden announced that he would drive the CFH Racing #67 entry full-time in 2015 with an option for an extension of the contract for a second year.
 Simon Pagenaud departed Schmidt Peterson Motorsports after three years and joined Team Penske in the No. 22 car.
 Team Penske president Tim Cindric confirmed on Twitter that defending series champion Will Power would be running the #1 car, as opposed to his usual #12.
 Ryan Briscoe did not return to Chip Ganassi Racing in 2015, and actively pursued another ride.
 James Hinchcliffe announced that he left Andretti Autosport to replace Pagenaud in the #5 Schmidt Peterson Racing car. He was joined in the team by James Jakes – replacing Mikhail Aleshin – who returned to the series after missing the 2014 season.
 Jack Hawksworth was confirmed to drive the #41 A. J. Foyt Enterprises car full-time in 2015. Takuma Sato returned to the team's #14 car.
 Mikhail Aleshin returned to Schmidt Peterson Motorsports in a 3rd entry at Sonoma.

Schedule

 Oval/Speedway
 Road course/Street circuit
BOLD indicates a Fuzzy's Ultra Premium Vodka Triple Crown event.

Schedule changes and notes
The Itaipava Brasília Indy 300 was scheduled to be held on March 8 at the Autódromo Internacional Nelson Piquet in Brasília, Brazil. On January 29, the race was cancelled by the Federal District officials newly elected in the 2014 national elections, where the incumbent Governor from the Workers' Party had been defeated, and replaced by the candidate from the Brazilian Socialist Party. As tires and fuel had already been shipped for the race, the series sent representatives to the Autódromo de Goiânia to check the viability of the venue to host the race.
NOLA Motorsports Park was announced to have a race over the weekend of April 10–12, 2015.
Texas Motor Speedway was confirmed to return to the June 4–6 weekend and that the race would be on NBCSN.
Auto Club Speedway was confirmed to be scheduled for June 27, moved from their usual date at the end of the season.
IndyCar & Mi-Jack Promotions announced on August 29, 2014, that the Houston doubleheader at NRG Park has been canceled for 2015 due to scheduling issues.
The races at Barber Motorsports Park (April 26), Mid-Ohio Sports Car Course (August 2) and Sonoma Raceway (August 30) were confirmed by the release of the Pirelli World Challenge schedule; PWC supports those events on the IndyCar calendar as well as St. Petersburg, Long Beach & Detroit.
 The Toronto Sun reported that the Honda Indy Toronto would stay at Exhibition Place and would be run on the weekend of June 12–14, 2015, to avoid a clash with the 2015 Pan American Games, due to be held the following month in the city. Unlike the last two seasons, the race weekend only featured one race instead of two, making Detroit the only double-header weekend of the season.
 The ABC Supply Wisconsin 250 at the Milwaukee Mile was confirmed to be held on July 12, 2015, by the Milwaukee Journal Sentinel.
 The ABC Supply 500 at Pocono Raceway was moved from the July 4 weekend date the track had in 2013 and 2014 to the weekend of August 23 for the 2015 season.

Rule changes
Aerokit modifications became specific to Honda and Chevy.
Double points were awarded for the Indianapolis 500 race and for the season finale at Sonoma only. Previously double points were awarded at the three 500 mile oval events.
Each team would continue to have two weeks of testing. Unlike past seasons, Promoter Days/Open Tests would count towards the testing allocation.
The medical exemption was eliminated from pit selections.  Pit selections are no longer based on drivers but teams' performance in the last race.  This change eliminates a disadvantage by one IndyCar team that used a "two-platoon" system, with driver based on the circuit.
Qualifying groups for qualifying at road/street course events was determined by the final practice session held before qualifying instead of by the first session of the weekend.
Standing starts have been eliminated for 2015. The series says more development is needed before re-introducing them to the series, especially after numerous aborted standing starts and a crash at Houston during the 2013 season, and a start-line pile-up at the Indianapolis road course race in 2014.
Each phase of the Indianapolis 500 Rookie Orientation Program saw see the speed requirements increased by 5 mph. Phase One consists of 10 laps at 205–210 mph, Phase Two of 15 laps at 210–215 mph and Phase Three of 15 laps at 215+ mph. The laps do not have to be consecutive. The phases and corresponding speeds may be adjusted based on track/weather conditions. The refresher program consisted of Phases Two and Three.

Race summaries

Round 1: St. Petersburg
The season opener at St. Petersburg was also the debut of unique aero kits for Honda and Chevrolet. Apprehension amongst the teams going into the race revolved around the complex, elaborate, and seemingly fragile front wings, and the lack of adequate replacement parts. The concerns were not unfounded, as dozens of on-track contacts throughout the field damaged countless wing components.

Will Power won the pole position, leading a Team Penske sweep of the first four positions on the grid. Power took the lead at the start, and led 75 laps. During the final round of pit stops, Juan Pablo Montoya grabbed the lead after he managed a quicker pit stop than Power. In the closing laps, Power chased down Montoya, and narrowed the gap to less than a second with 11 laps to go. Power tried to pass Montoya for the lead in turn 10, but the two cars touched, damaging Power's front wing. Montoya held the lead, and went on to win, his first road course victory in IndyCar racing since 1999.

Round 2: New Orleans
IndyCar made its first visit to NOLA Motorsports Park for the second round of the series. Lightning during qualifying in the middle of Round 1B cancelled the entire session, with the grid determined by entrant points, placing Juan Pablo Montoya on pole courtesy of having won the opening race in St. Petersburg. He was joined on the front row by Penske teammate Will Power.

The weather had eased on race day though not completely cleared, seeing the race begin in wet conditions. Montoya led the race early as conditions improved prompting a number of drivers to gamble on a switch to dry tires. Tony Kanaan and Ryan Hunter-Reay both stopped after 11 laps, a decision which proved too early as Kanaan spun off soon after. Conditions rapidly improved though and two laps later the leaders pitted for dry tires which promoted James Hinchcliffe into the lead, courtesy of an earlier stop. From there on the race was dictated by a series of caution periods as the drivers continued to struggle in the mixed conditions, the final caution period coming as Hunter-Reay, Sébastien Bourdais and Simon Pagenaud crashed together.

The series had announced a 1-hour and 45 minute time limit in the event of a wet race. Due to this time limit being reached in addition to the cautions, the race ended under yellow following the 3-car crash involving Hunter-Reay, Bourdais, and Pagenaud. Hinchcliffe won the race.

Round 3: Long Beach
Hélio Castroneves won the pole position with a track record of 1:06.7442, beating Sébastien Bourdais's mark set in Champ Car in 2006. Castroneves's Penske teammate Juan Pablo Montoya started alongside on the front row. At the start, Castroneves got the jump, and led into turn one.

During the first sequence of green flag pit stops on lap 29, Castoneves was briefly held in his pit box to avoid collision with Tony Kanaan, who was entering the stall just ahead. The delay cost Castroneves valuable track position, and allowed Scott Dixon to take over the lead. During the second round of pit stops on lap 55, Dixon was narrowly able to hold the lead, and cruised to victory, his first career win at Long Beach. With Dixon comfortably out in front, and Castroneves in second, the closing laps focused on a furious four-car battle for third place, led by Juan Pablo Montoya and Simon Pagenaud. Fifth place went to Tony Kanaan.

Round 4: Birmingham
With a second consecutive pole position, Hélio Castroneves took the front row with a time of 1:07.1925 alongside teammate Will Power, while a third-place effort by Simon Pagenaud made it another Penske 1-2-3 qualifying lock-out. Josef Newgarden took his first career victory, the fourth different winner in the four races thus far in the season.

Castroneves led early in the race, but lost the lead on lap 19 after another pit stop problem. The right-front tire changer lost a wheel nut, and that allowed Josef Newgarden to come to the lead. In the second half, Newgarden led, Scott Dixon was second, and Castroneves was third, but Graham Rahal was on a different pit strategy. As the leaders were attempting to save fuel and make it to the finish, Rahal pit on lap 70. With a full load of fuel, and new red option tires, Rahal went on a spirited charge to catch the leaders. He shaved 18 seconds off of Newgarden's lead, and passed Scott Dixon for second on the final lap. Newgarden held off the charge and won his first ever IndyCar race by just 2.2 seconds.

Castroneves ran out of fuel on the final lap, forcing him to pit, and he dropped to 15th. Will Power recovered from a collision exiting the pits (and subsequent drive-through penalty) on lap 24 to come home fourth. With Castroneves dropping to 15th at the finish, teammate Juan Pablo Montoya maintained the championship lead.

Round 5: Grand Prix of Indianapolis
Will Power won the pole position for the second annual Grand Prix of Indianapolis, continuing a dominating trend in 2015 for Penske Racing during qualifying. Penske cars qualified 1st, 3rd, 4th, and 5th, with Ganassi's Scott Dixon (2nd) situated on the outside of the front row.

At the start, a multi-car tangle in turn one saw Scott Dixon spin out in front of the entire field. Hélio Castroneves (in his milestone 300th Indy car start) was involved in contact, as was Josef Newgarden, and others. Will Power took the lead and dominated the race, leading 65 of 82 laps. Power became the fifth different winner in as many races for 2015.

Round 6: Indianapolis 500
2008 winner Scott Dixon started from pole position for the 99th running of the Indianapolis 500. In a Three way shootout over the 14 remaining laps with Will Power and Scott Dixon, Juan Pablo Montoya was crowned with his second Indianapolis 500 title.

Round 7: Detroit (Sat.)
A southwesterly cold front drenching the circuit for Saturday's race 1 of the Belle Isle Detroit Grand Prix, it was Will Power on pole position. In a wet race on the composite circuit, Carlos Munoz took his first IndyCar win, lapping through 9th place in the process. Runner-up was Marco Andretti; Simon Pagenaud finished 3rd.

Round 8: Detroit (Sun.)
The remnant of yesterday's cold front lingered in a fog over a soaking wet Belle Isle circuit for Sunday's race 2 of the Detroit Grand Prix. Qualification scrubbed, the grid formed up on the basis of driver points, Juan Pablo Montoya on pole position, with Will Power alongside, row 1. The first 37 laps were run caution free. Yet, 50% of the last 31 laps run under caution, seldom were there ever more than three consecutive green flag laps run, over the remaining portion of the race. The driver hasn't gotten his strategy correct, Sébastien Bourdais led to the stripe with 6 laps to go, gapped the field, and earned his first win of the 2015 season, Takuma Sato finished 2nd, Graham Rahal - 3rd.

Round 9: Texas
Under a clear sky, high heat, and 63% humidity, 23 cars took to the D-shaped 1.5 mile Texas Motor Speedway circuit with Will Power on pole position. Ganassi drivers Scott Dixon and Tony Kanaan finished first and second respectively, 7.8 seconds apart, with second-place Kanaan about 10 seconds ahead of third-place Hélio Castroneves.

Round 10: Toronto
With light rain as the field approached for the green flag, starter's orders called for a mandatory single-file rolling start. Will Power earned pole position; Josef Newgarden won the race, holding off his CFH Racing teammate Luca Filippi by 1.4 seconds, ahead of third-place Castroneves, fourth-place Power and Sébastien Bourdais in fifth.

Round 11: Fontana
Simon Pagenaud won pole position, followed by Hélio Castroneves, Marco Andretti, Ed Carpenter, Juan Montoya and Tony Kanaan. The lead would subsequently alternate 80 times throughout the 500-mile race, an IndyCar Series record. On lap 241, Sato collided into Will Power, taking them both out of the race. This would set up a late sprint to the finish when the green flag waved on lap 247. This allowed Rahal to complete the final two laps to the checkered flag under caution, for his first win of the year.

Round 12: Milwaukee
Josef Newgarden picked up his first career pole in the Verizon Indycar Series. The first caution didn't came until 114 when James Jakes lost an engine in turn 1. The second caution didn't fly until 131 when Ryan Briscoe spun and hit his country mate Will Power in turn 4. The 3rd and final caution came in lap 222 when Justin Wilson lost an engine in turn 1. Sébastien Bourdais eventually lapped the entire field. He managed to hold off Hélio Castroneves and Graham Rahal to pick up his 2nd win of the year. Sébastien Bourdais got his first oval win since 2006 and the 34th of his career, tying Al Unser Jr.

Round 13: Iowa
Hélio Castroneves picked up his 3rd pole at Iowa. The start was waved off when Hélio Castroneves jumped his country mate and friend Tony Kanaan. The first caution waved on lap 10 when Championship leader Juan Pablo Montoya crashed in turn 2. The second caution came on lap 25 when Charlie Kimball and Stefano Coletti got together in turn 3. The third caution waved on lap 108 when Justin Wilson got up high in turn 2, eventually cutting a tire down. The fourth caution came out on lap 172 when Charlie Kimball crashed in turn 2. The fifth caution came on lap 195 when Stefano Coletti crashed in turn 2. The sixth and final caution waved on lap 262 when Takuma Sato hit the wall in turn 2. Ryan Hunter Reay held off Josef Newgarden and Sage Karam to pick up his first win of the season. Ed Carpenter got out of his car after the race and confronted the 20 year old rookie driver from Nazareth Pennsylvania Sage Karam.

Round 14: Mid-Ohio
Scott Dixon captured the pole at Mid Ohio, his 2nd pole of the season. he was followed by Will Power, Sébastien Bourdais, Hélio Castroneves, Josef Newgarden, and Charlie Kimball. Early on Josef Newgarden ran Will Power off track in turn 4, the first caution came out when Charlie Kimball spun in turn 6, after getting his tire cut down from Will Power. The first restart came on lap 7. The 2nd caution came out when Stefano Coletti spun Takuma Sato in turn 4, and there was debris in various locations around the track. The next restart came on lap 26. The 3rd caution came when Sage Karam spun between turns 4 & 5. The next restart came on lap 70. The final caution came when Rodolfo González spun Charlie Kimball in turn 4. The final restart came on lap 84 when Graham Rahal held off a hard charging Justin Wilson for the win. Graham Rahal picked up his 2nd win of the season and 3rd of his career tying Ed Carpenter for wins, he was followed by Justin Wilson and Simon Pagenaud. Graham Rahal gained 33 points on Championship Leader Juan Pablo Montoya. The margin from 1st to 2nd in the championship was from 42 to 9.

Round 15: Pocono
Hélio Castroneves picked up his 4th pole of the season, and first at Pocono Raceway. The start was waved off twice when Hélio Castroneves jumped his teammate Simon Pagenaud. They finally waved the green flag on lap 2. The 2nd caution came when Jack Hawksworth lost a tire in turn 1, eventually Sage Karam and Juan Pablo Montoya dodged the lost tire from Jack Hawksworth. The restart came on lap 36. The 3rd caution came when Sébastien Bourdais wrecked in turn 2. The restart came on lap 42, the 4th caution came when Jack Hawksworth and Charlie Kimball getting together in turn 1. The next restart came on lap 92, the 5th caution came when Graham Rahal and Tristan Vautier crashed in turn 3. The next restart came on lap 103, the 6th caution came when debris from Ed Carpenter had contact from James Jakes, eventually the debris was on the frontstretch. The next restart came on lap 114, the 7th caution came when Tony Kanaan spun and hit the wall in turn 2. The next restart came on lap 138, the 8th caution came when Marco Andretti spun and hit wall in turn 2. The next restart came on lap 148, the 9th caution (season's record) came when a fox ran from the infield and through the catchfence. The next restart came on lap 166. The 10th caution came when Hélio Castroneves crashed in turn 1. The next restart came on lap 172. The 11th caution came when rookie Sage Karam spun and hit the wall in turn 1. As debris was strewn from the car, the nosecone section made contact with Justin Wilson's helmet inflicting severe brain damage. The unconscious Wilson then crashed into the infield at turn 1. The final restart came on lap 193, the 12th and final caution came on lap 197 when Rookie Gabby Chaves lost an engine. Ryan Hunter Reay picked up his 2nd win of the season, and 2nd out of the last 3 races, he held off Josef Newgarden and Juan Pablo Montoya for the win. The race set a new record of caution flags flew at an Indycar race, the record was previously held by the 2007 Indianapolis 500. On August 24, Justin Wilson succumbed to his injuries 24 hours after the race. He had been in a coma following the injury he had received during the race. His death marked the first fatality for the Dallara DW12 and the first since Dan Wheldon at Las Vegas Motor Speedway during the IZOD IndyCar World Championship.

Round 16: Sonoma

Heading into the final race of the 2015 season, six drivers had a mathematical chance of winning the championship. Those drivers were Juan Pablo Montoya, Graham Rahal, Scott Dixon, Will Power, Hélio Castroneves, and Josef Newgarden. Championship Contender Will Power picks up his 6th pole of the season, 5th at Sonoma, and his 35th pole in his career. He was followed by the other 4 championship contenders Newgarden (2nd), Montoya (5th), and Rahal (6th). The drivers who are not in the championship started in the top 6: Ryan Hunter Reay (3rd) and Simon Pagenaud (4th). Other championship contenders Dixon started 9th and Castroneves started 15th. The race ran the first 32 laps without a caution until Luca Filippi brought out the first caution when he slow on the track. The first restart came on lap 38, it didn't take long to get the 2nd caution came on lap 39 when Championship Leader Juan Pablo Montoya took out his championship rival and teammate Will Power in turn 4. The next restart came on lap 42, the 3rd caution came on lap 65 when James Jakes crashed in turn 9. The next to last restart came on lap 69. The fourth and final caution came on lap 71 when Jack Hawksworth spun Carlos Muñoz in turn 7. The final restart came on lap 73, late in the race Sébastien Bourdais spun Championship Contender Graham Rahal in turn 7 and there was no caution for that because Graham Rahal got the car going, Bourdais got a drive thru penalty for avoidable contact. After the race Rahal got out of his car and went to confront Bourdais. Dixon won his third win at Sonoma Raceway, third of the year, and back to back wins at Sonoma Raceway like Will Power did in 2010 and 2011. Scott Dixon won his 4th championship tying Dario Franchitti, Sébastien Bourdais and Mario Andretti for U.S. open wheel titles. Dixon was followed by Ryan Hunter Reay and Charlie Kimball. Scott Dixon won the tiebreaker over Juan Pablo Montoya because Dixon had 3 wins to Montoya's 2. This race marked the final race of six time race winner Ryan Briscoe's career as he would not return to Schmidt Peterson Motorsports for 2016, therefore bringing an end to his 11-season career.

Results

Points standings

 Ties are broken by number of wins, followed by number of 2nds, 3rds, etc., then by number of pole positions, followed by number of times qualified 2nd, etc.

Driver standings

 One championship point is awarded to any driver for each lap they lead during a race. Two additional championship points are awarded to the driver who leads most laps during a race.
 At all races except the Indy 500, the number 1 qualifier earns one point.
 Entrant-initiated engine change-outs will result in the loss of ten points.
 Qualification points were not awarded for the Indy 500 due to last minute regulatory changes.

Entrant standings

 Based on the entrant, used for oval qualifications order, and starting grids when qualifying is cancelled
 Only full-time entrants, and at-large part-time entrants shown.

Manufacturer standings

 The top three finishing drivers from each manufacturer in each race/qualifying score championship points for their respective manufacturer, provided they were using one of their four allotted engines.
 Two additional points are awarded to the manufacturer if one of their entrants leads most laps of a race.
 At all races except the Indy 500, the manufacturer who qualifies on pole earns one point.
 Manufacturers will earn ten points for each engine reaching the 2500-mile change-out threshold. Manufacturers will lose twenty points for each engine failing to reach the change-out threshold, or for a non-minor repair requiring a component change.
 A tie in points is broken, by number of wins, followed by number of 2nds, 3rds, etc., then by number of pole positions, followed by number of times qualified 2nd, etc.

Notes

References

External links
 

IndyCar Series seasons
Motorsport in Wisconsin
 
IndyCar Series
IndyCar Series
IndyCar Series